Rüdiger von Bechelaren is a legendary hero of German mythology immortalised in the Nibelungenlied saga. Serving as the Austrian Margrave of Pöchlarn and a member of Etzel's court, he becomes conflicted after swearing oaths to uphold two factions that ultimately go to war against each other.

Character

Rüdiger is noted for his hospitality and kindness throughout the story, and offers his daughter's hand in marriage to Giselher of Burgundy. While escorting the Burgundian envoy to Kriemhilde, he swears his absolute protection to them. However Kriemhilde takes offence at the actions of Hagen and demands Rüdiger assist her in warring against him. Caught between the conflicting loyalties, Rüdiger is asked by Hagen in the middle of the ensuing battle to fulfill his earlier vow and give up his battle-shield to Hagen who has lost his own, despite fighting on the opposite side. Rüdiger complies, and is then killed by Gernot who is wielding a sword that Rudiger had likewise gifted him.

History
Like many legendary figures, there are only traces that can be connected in history. In the necrology of the former canon of St. Andrä an der Traisen on December 4, 1203, there is an entry for a certain "Rudegerus Marchio", or "Markgrave Rüdiger". As mythological figures were never added to death logs, it is assumed that this is evidence that Rüdiger von Bechelaren is indeed an historical person.

Sources

Der Ring des Nibelungen
German heroic legends
Nibelung tradition
Legendary Norsemen